Diego Corrientes is a 1937 Spanish historical adventure film directed by Ignacio F. Iquino. It portrays the life of the eighteenth century highwaymen Diego Corrientes Mateos, one of four films to do so.

Cast
 Goyita Herrero 
 Pedro Terol as Diego Corrientes  
 Blanquita Gil as Rosario  
 Jesús Castro Blanco as El Renegao  
 Federico Gandía as Teniente Bellido  
 Paco Martínez Soria 
 Gastón A. Mantua 
 Juana Bozzo

References

Bibliography
 de España, Rafael. Directory of Spanish and Portuguese film-makers and films. Greenwood Press, 1994.

External links 

1937 films
1930s Spanish-language films
Films directed by Ignacio F. Iquino
Films set in the 18th century
Films set in Spain
Films set in Portugal
1930s historical adventure films
1930s crime films
Spanish crime films
Spanish historical adventure films
Spanish black-and-white films